Yao Séyram Junior Sènaya (born 19 April 1984 in Lomé) is a Togolese former football player who played as a striker or as a midfielder. He is the younger brother of Yao Mawuko Sènaya.

Football career
Sènaya spent his entire professional career in Switzerland, playing for many teams including FC Basel.

He was released by FC La Chaux-de-Fonds in summer 2008.

International
He is a core member of the Togo national team and played in the 2006 African Cup of Nations as well as the 2006 World Cup in Germany where he made appearances in all three games Togo played.

Yao Junior Sènaya is easy to pick out on the pitch, being known his more "exotic" hairstyles.  At the African Nations Cup in 2006 he had bleach blonde hair.

He is a popular figure with the Togo fans. Such is his popularity that former Togo coach Tchalile Bana was forced to seek police protection from angry supporters following Sènaya's substitution during a 2002 World Cup qualifier tie against rivals Angola.

External links
Profile on BBC Sport
Profile on ESPN
Togo World Cup squad - Guardian.co.uk
Junior Sènaya at fluctuat.net

1984 births
Living people
Sportspeople from Lomé
Togolese footballers
Togolese expatriate footballers
Togo international footballers
2002 African Cup of Nations players
2006 Africa Cup of Nations players
2006 FIFA World Cup players
2010 Africa Cup of Nations players
FC Concordia Basel players
FC Thun players
FC Basel players
Al Jazirah Al Hamra Club players
Dibba Al-Hisn Sports Club players
UAE First Division League players
Swiss Super League players
SC Young Fellows Juventus players
FC Wangen bei Olten players
FC La Chaux-de-Fonds players
Togolese expatriate sportspeople in Switzerland
Expatriate footballers in Switzerland
Association football forwards
Association football midfielders
21st-century Togolese people